Eastland is a city in Eastland County, Texas, United States. Its population was 3,960 at the 2010 census. It is the county seat of Eastland County.

History
During the 1920s, Eastland, like nearby Cisco, Ranger, and Desdemona, was a petroleum boomtown.

Eastland is known for the legend of "Old Rip", a horned toad that allegedly lived many years sealed in the cornerstone of the previous Eastland courthouse built in 1897.

The recession of 1921 exacerbated racial tensions between Anglos and Mexicans.  Naturally, unemployment increased in town and Whites attempted to oust Mexicans who were hired during the WWI boom. Masked men ravaged shacks used by Mexicans as living quarters. Whites threatened Mexicans' lives, and fearful, they fled to nearby Fort Worth to seek help from the Mexican Consulate, since local authorities took the side of the Anglo locals.

In 1928, the current courthouse was erected, the prior cornerstone was opened, and "Old Rip" was allegedly found alive. The animal, a kind of lizard, received national publicity. It died in 1929 of pneumonia, and was placed in a glass-front casket on view in the present courthouse.

Geography
Eastland is located north of the center of Eastland County at  (32.398715, −98.821144). The city is accessed by Interstate 20 between exits 340 to the south and 343 to the east.

Demographics

2020 census

As of the 2020 United States census, there were 3,609 people, 1,535 households, and 950 families residing in the city.

2000 census
As of the census of 2000,  3,769 people, 1,475 households, and 998 families were living in the city. The population density was 1,333.1 people/ sq mi (514.2/km2). The 1,737 housing units averaged 614.4/sq mi (237.0/km2). The racial makeup of the city was 91.64% White, 1.80% African American, 0.53% Native American, 0.13% Asian, 4.72% from other races, and 1.17% from two or more races. Hispanics or Latinos of any race were 12.89% of the population.

Of the 1,475 households, 33.8% had children under  18 living with them, 53.2% were married couples living together, 10.8% had a female householder with no husband present, and 32.3% were not families. About 29.4% of all households were made up of individuals, and 15.5% had someone living alone who was 65  or older. The average household size was 2.45, and the average family size was 3.04.

In the city, theage distribution was 25.7% under 18, 9.1% from 18 to 24, 25.2% from 25 to 44, 20.2% from 45 to 64, and 19.8% who were 65  or older. The median age was 38 years. For every 100 females, there were 89.6 males. For every 100 females age 18 and over, there were 85.2 males.

The median income for a household in the city was $28,277, and for a family was $34,333. Males had a median income of $27,072 versus $16,574 for females. The per capita income for the city was $17,339. About 14.2% of families and 17.0% of the population were below the poverty line, including 25.0% of those under age 18 and 12.7% of those age 65 or over.

Government
The Texas Eleventh Court of Appeals is located in the Eastland County Courthouse in Eastland.

Education
The city is served by the Eastland Independent School District and is home of the Eastland Mavericks.

Notable people

 Emma Carter Browning (1910–2010), aviation executive and pilot
 Hayden Fry (1929–2019), college football coach
 Ira L. Hanna (1908–1978), 36th mayor of Cheyenne, Wyoming
 Richard D. Lawrence, United States Army lieutenant general
 Don Pierson (1925–1996), former mayor of Eastland, business innovator, communications pioneer (Radio England), and civic leader
 Doc Scurlock (1849–1929), Old West figure and founding member of the Regulators, who rode with such men as Billy the Kid
 Barney Smith
 Clayton W. Williams, Sr. (1895–1983), an engineer with the Oil Belt Power Company, lived in Eastland during the early 1920s

Climate
The climate in this area is characterized by hot, humid summers and generally mild to cool winters. According to the Köppen climate classification, Eastland has a humid subtropical climate, Cfa on climate maps.

Gallery

References

External links
 City of Eastland official website
 Eastland Chamber of Commerce
 Community site sponsored by the Eastland Economic Development Corporation
 Eastland Independent School District
 KATX radio
 Eastland County Today, local newspapers
 MicroplexNews, local independent news outlet

Cities in Texas
Cities in Eastland County, Texas
County seats in Texas